Indacaterol/glycopyrronium bromide, sold under the brand name Ultibro Breezhaler among others, is a fixed-dose combination medication for inhalation consisting of the following two active ingredients:
Indacaterol maleate—an ultra-long-acting beta-adrenoceptor agonist (ultra-LABA);
Glycopyrronium bromide (glycopyrrolate)—a muscarinic anticholinergic.

Indacaterol maleate/glycopyrronium bromide is used as a maintenance bronchodilator treatment to relieve symptoms in adult patients with chronic obstructive pulmonary disease (COPD).

The drug is marketed by Novartis under the trade names Ultibro Breezhaler and Utibron Neohaler in Europe and the United States, respectively. In 2016, Novartis licensed its U.S. commercial rights for Seebri Neohaler and Utibron Neohaler to Sunovion Pharmaceuticals.

References

External links 
 

Beta-adrenergic agonists
Muscarinic antagonists
Combination drugs
Novartis brands